Otto von Lutterberg (died 16 February 1270) was the Landmeister of the Livonian Order of the Teutonic Knights from 1267 to 1270.

History 
The Battle of Rakvere took place during his command of the Livonian Order, when on February 18, 1268, the combined forces of vassals of the Danish crown, Livonian Knights and local Estonian militia fought the combined forces of Novgorod and Pskov; the outcome of the battle is in dispute in the chronicles. However, according to the Livonian Rhymed Chronicle Otto von Luttenberg was not present during the battle (being at that time in Semigallia) but in June of the following year led a Livonian retaliatory expedition to the lands of Pskov, where the forces under his command burned the castle of Izborsk, the town around Pskov castle and laid siege to the castle itself. The siege ended with a truce after the defenders received reinforcements from Novgorod. Von Luttenberg then hastily traveled to Riga where he kidnapped and arrested the Archbishop of Riga Alfred Suerbeer, and thus solved the long-simmering power struggle with the Archbishop in favor of the Order, the bishop being released only after he promised not to appeal to the Pope or oppose the Order in the future.

Otto von Luttenberg was killed in 1270 at the Battle of Karuse against the Grand Duchy of Lithuania.  He is buried in Karuse village church, in present-day Estonia.

References 

Masters of the Livonian Order
People of the Northern Crusades
Teutonic Knights
People from the State of the Teutonic Order
Military personnel killed in action
13th-century people of the Holy Roman Empire
13th-century births
1270 deaths